This page concerns Lydian Bageis, Bagis or Bage, not to be confounded with Bagae in Numidia.
Bageis, Bagis (Βάγις), or Bage (Βάγη) was an ancient Greek city in the province of Lydia in Asia Minor (modern day Turkey).

Name 
The name of the city appears in the form Bageis (in the genitive plural case of the name of its inhabitants, ΒΑΓΝΩΝ or ΒΑΓΗΝΩΝ) on its coins, but Bagis is the form given in the Synecdemos of Hierocles, and Bage in later Notitiae Episcopatuum. Some of its coins add the additional name of KAISAREΩN apparently denoting the additional city name of Caesarea.

Location
Inscriptions uncovered by Keppel place the ancient town near Sirghe on the left (south) side of the Hermos River. Modern scholars pinpoint a site at Güre.

Ecclesiastical history

The episcopal see of Bagis, being in the Roman province of Lydia was a suffragan of Sardis, the capital of the province.

The acts of the First Council of Nicaea (325) mention a Pollio as bishop of Baris in that province. Since there is no evidence of a bishopric of that name, Janin (1931), following Adolf von Harnack, consider "Baris" to be an error for "Bagis", while Pétrirdès (1907), who cites Heinrich Gelzer and C. H. Turner, does not accept that correction. Other known bishops of Bagis are Chrysapius or Chrysanthus, who was at the Robber Council of Ephesus in 449, Leonides, who was a signatory of the joint letter that the bishops of Lydia sent in 459 to Byzantine Emperor Leo I the Thracian with regard to the murder of Proterius of Alexandria, and Basilius and Clemens, who were at the Council of Constantinople (879), presumably one of them ordained by Patriarch Ignatius of Constantinople, the other by Photius.

Bagis must have disappeared as a residential see during the Turkish-Byzantine wars, perhaps in the 12th century, although it continued to be listed in Notitiae Episcopatuum.

No longer a residential bishopric, Bagis is today listed by the Catholic Church as a titular see. a list of titular bishops includes:
St. Francesco Antonio Domenico Fogolla, (28 Jun 1898 Appointed - 9 Jul 1900) 
Joaquim Silvério de Souza † (16 Nov 1901 Appointed - 17 May 1905)Bishop of Diamantina.
Celestin Ibáñez y Aparicio,(12 Apr 1911  - 11 Apr 1946)  Bishop of Yan’an [Yenan]) 
Jorge Marcos de Oliveira (3 Aug 1946 Appointed - 26 Jul 1954, Bishop of Santo André, Sao Paulo 
Ramón Pastor Bogarín Argaña (1 Dec 1954 Appointed - 19 Jan 1957, Bishop of San Juan Bautista de las Misiones 
Albert Sanschagrin, (12 Aug 1957  - 13 Jun 1967) Bishop of Saint-Hyacinthe, Québec) 
José Afonso Ribeiro, (29 Jan 1979 Appointed - 6 Jul 1988, Prelate of Borba, Amazonas) 
João Evangelista Martins Terra (17 Aug 1988 Appointed - )

References

Large database of ancient coins of Bagis on wildwinds.com

Populated places in ancient Lydia
Roman towns and cities in Turkey
Populated places of the Byzantine Empire
Former populated places in Turkey
Bagis
History of Uşak Province